Jaén Province may refer to:
 Jaén Province, Peru
 Province of Jaén (Spain)

See also 
 Jaén (disambiguation)

Province name disambiguation pages